Fellach (also: Fella) is a small river of Bavaria, Germany. It flows into the Aura in Fellen.

See also
List of rivers of Bavaria

References

Rivers of Bavaria
Rivers of the Spessart
Rivers of Germany